Lunar Mission One was a proposed international, crowdfunded, robotic mission to the Moon, led by Lunar Missions Limited in England. They did not obtain $1 billion funding for research, development and launch of a spacecraft, meant to be launched in 2024. The Lunar Mission One program closed down due to tax issues.

Overview
The mission, which is in its early conceptual stages, aims to send a lunar lander to the Moon in 2024. The lander would drill below the surface of the Lunar South Pole to a depth of up to 100m, in the hope of accessing lunar rock up to 4.5 billion years old. The lunar lander would contain scientific instruments to explore the science and geology behind the origins of the Moon and the Solar System.

After drilling, the module would place a time capsule into the borehole. This time capsule would contain a public archive, with a record of Earth's biosphere and a history of human civilization, and a private archive consisting of millions of digital memory boxes. Consumers would be able to purchase digital memory boxes, and fill them with digital data such as photos or videos. They would also be able to store their DNA via a strand of hair. Lunar Missions Limited has set the total cost of the mission at £500 million and it is aiming to raise these funds through global sales of digital memory boxes.

Funding for the initial legal fees was raised on the international crowd-funding platform, Kickstarter. The fundraising was successfully completed on 17 December 2014, with £672,447 ($1,017,000 approx.) being pledged, exceeding the minimum target of £600,000 ($900,000 approx.).

Management
Lunar Missions Limited is a company chaired by Ian Taylor, former UK Minister for Science and Technology. Directors of the company include David Iron and Angela Lamont. The technical advisor for the first stage of the project is RAL Space.

Lunar Mission One is overseen by the Lunar Missions Trust which is also responsible for the education program to be developed around Lunar Mission One, primarily focusing on STEM subjects. The Trust is chaired by Sir Graeme Davies and trustees include Monica Grady and David Iron.

The Lunar Mission One program closed down due to VAT tax issues.

References

External links

Kickstarter-funded public works
Proposed space probes
Non-profit organisations based in the United Kingdom
Missions to the Moon